Butterfly is a 2004 Hong Kong drama film based on Taiwanese writer Xue Chen's novel The Mark of Butterfly (蝴蝶的記號). The film was directed by female award-winning director Yan Yan Mak and produced by Jacqueline Liu and Yan Yan Mak with the sponsorship of Hong Kong Art Development Council.

Plot
The film follows Flavia (Josie Ho), a married high school teacher, who meets a beautiful free-spirited female singer-songwriter named Yip (Tian Yuan) and strikes up a relationship with the younger girl. Flavia is a closeted lesbian because she was brought up in a society where homosexuality was not accepted. When Flavia was a teenager, she fell in love with a girl in her class, but was forced to end the relationship when it was discovered by her parents. Heartbroken, she eventually married a competent and caring businessman after graduating from university. Now in her 30s and married with a child, she meets Yip. Flavia is deeply attracted to Yip's carefree personality and bright spirit, and falls for Yip in the same way she fell for her first love in high school. She slowly dares to break out while worried about the consequences but at the same time, hopeful about finding her true self again.

Cast

 Josie Ho as Flavia - Ming's wife
 Eric Kot as Ming - Flavia's husband
 Yuan Tian as Yip - Singer
 Stephanie Che as Jin / Flavia's school sweetheart
 Yat Ning Chan as Young Flavia (billed as Isabel Chan)
 Joman Chiang as Young Jin
 Kenneth Tsang as Flavia's dad
 Pauline Yam as Rosa - Yip's roommate
 Carl Ng as Carl - Man in Macau bar
 Yuen-Leung Poon as Man in coffee shop
 Redbean Lau as Flavia's mum
 Brenda Chan as Samantha's mother
 King-Suen Chan as Student demonstrator
 Kathi DeCouto as University Professor
 Alice Lee as Pauline
 Nicky Shih as Demonstrator & university student
 Stanley Tam as Chemistry teacher
 Wong Sin Ting Zeni as Muriel - Flavia's student

Soundtrack
The film features a set of interesting music and songs from various artistes such as Múm, an experimental Icelandic musical group; Hopscotch, Tian Yuan's independent Chinese band and at17, a Hong Kong Folktronica band.

Now There's That Fear Again, from Múm's album Finally We Are No One,
Sleep, Swim (as above),
Green Grass of Tunnel (as above),
Weeping Rock, Rock, from Múm's album Summer Make Good, 
A Wishful Way, from Hopscotch's (Tian Yuan's band) album A Wishful Way
She (as above),
The Best is Yet to Come, from at17's album Meow Meow Meow.

Reception 

Butterfly was chosen as the Opening Film at Venice Film Festival Critics Week and Tian Yuan was awarded as the Best New Artist at the Hong Kong Film Awards in 2005. The film was also nominated at the Taiwan Golden Horse Awards in 2004 for Best Adapted Screenplay (Yan Yan Mak) and Best New Performer (Tian Yuan). Also, actress Josie Ho received a nomination at the Golden Bauhinia Awards for Best Actress and at ILMA Awards for Best Leading Actress, both in 2005.

Also, a blogger on Grace the Spot, a lesbian entertainment and pop culture blog, rated Butterfly as her favourite lesbian film.

Casting and hidden feature
According to the commentary on the DVD, director Yan Yan Mak invited Ellen Joyce Loo and Eman Lam of at17 to star as two of Flavia's students who also fall in love with each other, but they rejected the roles. The role later was taken by Isabel Chen and Joman Chiang.

There is a hidden music video of the song 'I will see you', sung by Tian Yuan, in the DVD (2005 Hong Kong version).

See also
 List of LGBT-related films directed by women
 List of Hong Kong films

References

External links 
 Butterfly review at www.sogoodreviews.com
 
 
 Butterfly at ELMS

2004 films
2004 drama films
2004 LGBT-related films
Hong Kong LGBT-related films
Lesbian-related films
2000s Cantonese-language films
2000s Mandarin-language films
LGBT-related drama films
2000s Hong Kong films